The Swansea Senior Association Football League or Swansea Senior League, is a league competition featuring non-professional association football clubs in the area of Swansea, south Wales.  The league consists of seven divisions, three for "first teams" and four for "reserves" and lower teams.  The top division, Division One is just below West Wales Premier League, and therefore sits at level 5 of the Welsh football pyramid.

History
Formed in 1901 as the Swansea Junior League, the first organised league in the Swansea area launched a Senior League in 1903–04, followed in 1904–05 by a name change to the Swansea & District League.  The league was suspended during World War I.   During the 1921–22 and 1922–23 seasons, the league expanded to include a Gower Division and a Neath Division.

At the outbreak of World War II in September 1939 all local leagues in Swansea suspended football, but in October both the Swansea & District League and a second league, the Swansea Gwalia League approved a merger for the duration of the war years as the Swansea Gwalia Combination with the league operating two senior divisions.  In May 1946 the leagues agreed a permanent merger, with the league to be known as the Swansea District Gwalia League. In the 1947–48, the league changed its name to the current league title of the Swansea Senior Association Football League.

Member clubs for 2022–23 season
The following clubs are competing in the Swansea Senior Football League during the 2022–23 season.

Division One

Birchgrove Colts
Blaen-y-Maes
Brynawel 
Murton Rovers
Plough Colts 
Port Tennant Colts 
Rockspur 
St Josephs 
Waunarlwydd Galaxy 
Ynystawe Athletic

Division Two

CRC Olympic 
Clase Social
FC Bonymaen
Landore  
Llangyfelach
Penclawdd 
Ragged School
Treboeth United

Division Three

African Community Centre
Bonymaen Colts
Cwm Albion
Cwmfelin Press 
Gors  
Kingsbridge Colts
St Thomas Stars
Union Rangers

Champions

1900s

 1901–02: – Pontardawe
 1902–03: – East Side 
 1903–04: – 
 1904–05: – 
 1905–06: – 
 1906–07: – Swansea Town
 1907–08: – Swansea Town
 1908–09: – Morriston 
 1909–10: – Mond Nickel Works

1910s

 1910–11: – Swansea United 
 1911–12: – 
 1912–13: – Milford Town
 1913–14: – Swansea Town
 1914–15: – No competition due to World War 1
 1915–16: – No competition due to World War 1
 1916–17: – No competition due to World War 1
 1917–18: – No competition due to World War 1
 1918–19: – No competition due to World War 1
 1919–20: – Competition not completed

1920s

 1920–21: – 
 1921–22: – 
 1922–23: – 
 1923–24: – Cwm Athletic
 1924–25: – Cwm Athletic
 1925–26: – Cwm Athletic
 1926–27: – Cwm Athletic
 1927–28: – 
 1928–29: – 
 1929–30: –

1930s

 1930–31: – Cwm Athletic
 1931–32: – North End
 1932–33: – 
 1933–34: – 
 1934–35: – 
 1935–36: – 
 1936–37: – 
 1937–38: – 
 1938–39: – 
 1939–40: –

1940s

 1940–41: – 
 1941–42: – 
 1942–43: – 
 1943–44: – 
 1944–45: – 
 1945–46: – 
 1946–47: – Cwm Albions
 1947–48: – Briton Ferry 
 1948–49: – Midland Athletic 
 1949–50: – Stepney

1950s

 1950–51: – Cwm Athletic
 1951–52: – 
 1952–53: – 
 1953–54: – 
 1954–55: – 
 1955–56: – 
 1956–57: – Swansea Dockers
 1957–58: – 
 1958–59: – North End
 1959–60: – North End

1960s

 1960–61: – North End
 1961–62: – Hillsborough
 1962–63: – Tower United
 1963–64: – Swansea Town 'A'
 1964–65: – North End
 1965–66: – North End
 1966–67: – North End 
 1967–68: – St Josephs 
 1968–69: – United 
 1969–70: – Swansea Boys Club

1970s

 1970–71: – West End 
 1971–72: – Swansea Boys Club
 1972–73: – United
 1973–74: – West End
 1974–75: – West End
 1975–76: – Swansea Boys Club
 1976–77: – West End
 1977–78: – Ragged School
 1978–79: – Swansea Boys Club
 1979–80: – Swansea Boys Club

1980s

 1980–81: – 
 1981–82: – Ragged School
 1982–83: – West End
 1983–84: – Ragged School
 1984–85: –
 1985–86: – West End
 1986–87: – 
 1987–88: – Port Tennant Colts
 1988–89: – Blaenymaes
 1989–90: –

1990s

 1990–91: – 
 1991–92: – 
 1992–93: – 
 1993–94: – 
 1994–95: – West End
 1995–96: – 
 1996–97: – West End
 1997–98: – West End
 1998–99: – West End
 1999–2000: – West End

2000s

 2000–01 – Ragged School 
 2001–02: – 
 2002–03: – West End
 2003–04: – 
 2004–05: – West End
 2005–06: – 
 2006–07: – Winch Wen
 2007–08: – Ragged School
 2008–09: – Ragged School
 2009–10: – Ragged School

2010s

 2010–11: – Swansea Dockers
 2011–12: – Penlan Club
 2012–13: – Kilvey United
 2013–14: – Penlan Club
 2014–15: – Penlan Club
 2015–16: – Penlan Club
 2016–17: – Team Swansea
 2017–18: – West End Rangers
 2018–19: – Penlan Club
 2019-20: – Rockspur Fords

2020s

2020–21: Season void
2021–22: – Rockspur Fords

Senior Cup Winners

The first league cup competition was held in 1908–09 with Mond Nickel Works being winners. They were successful in all the pre-World War competitions apart from the 1910–11 season when they were knocked out at the semi-final stage by Swansea United. A partial list of the winners of the Senior Cup competition can be found below.

Ragged School have won the cup 14 times.

 1908–09: – Mond Nickel Works
 1909–10: – Mond Nickel Works
 1911–12: – Mond Nickel Works
 1912–13: – Mond Nickel Works (replay)
 1913–14: – Mond Nickel Works
 1914–15: – No competition due to World War 1
 1915–16: – No competition due to World War 1
 1916–17: – No competition due to World War 1
 1917–18: – No competition due to World War 1
 1918–19: – No competition due to World War 1
 1919–20: – Gorseinon
 1924–25: – Cwm Athletic
 1925–26: – Cwm Athletic
 1926–27: – Cwm Athletic
 1928–29: – Cwm Athletic
 1929–30: – Cwm Athletic
 1930–31: – Cwm Athletic
 1931–32: – North End   
 1936–37: – Alexandra  
 1951–52: – Mumbles Albion
 1953–54: – Swansea Boys Club 
 1954–55: – Swansea Boys Club  
 1955–56: – Swansea Boys Club   
 1958–59: – North End
 1963–64: – Swansea Town 'A'
 1967–68: – United 
 1968–69: – United 
 1969–70: – United 
 1970–71: – West End 
 1971–72: – United 
 1977–78: – Ragged School 
 1979–80: – Ragged School 
 1980–81: – St. Joseph's 
 1988–89: – Blaenymaes
 1990–91: – Ragged School 
 1991–92: – Ragged School 
 1992–93: – Ragged School 
 1993–94: – Port Tennant Colts 
 1996–97: – Maltsters Sports 
 2000–01:  – Ragged School 
 2008–09: – Cwm Press
 2009–10: – Swansea Dockers
 2010–11: – Cwm Press
 2011–12: – Ragged School
 2012–13: – Swansea Dockers
 2013–14: – Ragged School
 2014–15: –  Competition suspended
 2015–16: – Ynystawe Athletic
 2016–17: – Penlan Club
 2017–18: – Penlan Club
 2018–19: – Penlan Club
 2019–20: –  Competition void - Coronavirus pandemic
 2020–21: –  Competition cancelled - Coronavirus pandemic
 2021–22: – Rockspur Fords

Other 2021–22 competition Winners

Open Cup – Rockspur Fords
Charity Shield – Rockspur Fords

Notable players
Lee Trundle

References

Bibliography

External links
Swansea Senior Football League (Official Site)

Swansea Senior League
Sport in Swansea
Football leagues in Wales